Andulbaria Union is a union parishad situated at Jibannagar Upazila,  in Chuadanga District, Khulna Division of Bangladesh. There are 13 villages and 11 mouzas in the union.

References

External links
 

Unions of Khulna Division
Unions of Chuadanga District
Unions of Jibannagar Upazila